Nothing Lasts Forever may refer to:

Fiction 
Nothing Lasts Forever (Sheldon novel), a 1994 novel by Sidney Sheldon, adapted for a 1995 TV miniseries
Nothing Lasts Forever (Thorp novel), a 1979 novel by Roderick Thorp, basis for the film Die Hard
Nothing Lasts Forever (film), a 1984 film
"Nothing Lasts Forever" (Lucifer), a 2021 TV episode
"Nothing Lasts Forever" (The X-Files), a 2018 TV episode

Music

Albums
Nothing Lasts Forever (album), by Defiance, or the title song, 1998
Nothing Lasts Forever (Tribe of Gypsies EP) or the title song, 1997
Nothing Lasts Forever (Coldrain EP), 2010
Nothing Lasts Forever (And It's Fine), by Flora Cash, 2017

Songs
"Nothing Lasts Forever" (Echo & the Bunnymen song), 1997
"Nothing Lasts Forever" (Jebediah song), 2002
"Nothing Lasts Forever" (The Living End song), 2006
"Nothing Lasts Forever", by Maroon 5 from It Won't Be Soon Before Long, 2007
"Nothing Lasts Forever", by Bananarama from Pop Life, 1991 (unreleased)
"Nothing Lasts Forever", by the Early November from Imbue, 2015
"Nothing Lasts Forever", by Natalia Kills from Perfectionist, 2011
"Nothing Lasts Forever", by Ride from Tarantula, 1996
"Nothing Lasts Forever", by Sam Hunt from Southside, 2020
"Nothing Lasts Forever", by Transit from Young New England, 2013